Clan Douglas (Gaelic: Dùbhghlas) is an ancient clan or noble house from the Scottish Lowlands.

Taking their name from Douglas in Lanarkshire, their leaders gained vast territories throughout the Borders, Angus, Lothian, Moray, and also in France and Sweden. The family is one of the most ennobled in the United Kingdom and has held numerous titles.

The Douglases were one of Scotland's most powerful families, and certainly the most prominent family in lowland Scotland during the Late Middle Ages, often holding the real power behind the throne of the Stewart kings. The heads of the House of Douglas held the titles of the Earl of Douglas (Black Douglas) and later the Earl of Angus (Red Douglas). The clan does not currently have a chief recognised by the Lord Lyon. The principal Douglas today is the Duke of Hamilton, but as his surname is "Douglas-Hamilton" rather than simply "Douglas" the laws of the Lyon Court prevent him from assuming the chiefship of the name.

The original caput of the family was Douglas Castle in Lanarkshire. The Kirk of St Bride at Douglas, along with Melrose Abbey and the Abbey of Saint-Germain-des-Prés holds the remains of many of the Earls of Douglas and Angus.

The Swedish branch is descended from Field Marshal Robert Douglas, Count of Skenninge, and has been one of Sweden's most prominent noble families since the 17th century.

History

Origins 

In modern texts, the family's surname is thought to derive from the village of Douglas, the name of which comes from the Gaelic elements dubh, meaning "dark, black"; and glas, meaning "stream" (in turn from Old Gaelic dub and glais). However, according to the 17th century historian Frederic van Bossen, the Douglas name means "gray hairs in the old language", and it was first given to a Lord Shulton, who lived in the 8th century. Frederic van Bossen states Lord Shulton was a descendant of Adrolena of Shaultow who was a descendant of the Princes of Caledonia.

In 1179 William Douglas was Lord of Douglas; he is the first certain record of the name Douglas and undoubtedly the ancestor of the family. He witnessed a charter between 1175 and 1199 by the Bishop of Glasgow to the monks of Kelso. His grandson, also Sir William de Douglas had two sons who fought at the Battle of Largs in 1263 against the Norsemen.

One old tradition is that the first chief of Douglas was Sholto Douglas who helped the king of Scotland win a battle in the year 767. This is not substantiated and likely to be pseudohistory.

The true progenitor of Clan Douglas was probably "Theobaldus Flammatius" (Theobald the Fleming), who in 1147 received the lands near Douglas Water in Lanarkshire in return for services for the Abbot of Kelso, who held the barony and lordship of Holydean. The Douglas family names consisted of Arkenbald and Freskin, and were believed to be related to the Clan Murray, believed to be descended from a Flemish knight called Freskin. It seems likely that he was the father of the first William Douglas.

However the Flemish origin of the Douglases has been disputed, it has been claimed that the lands which were granted to Theobald the Fleming were not the lands from which the Douglas family later emerged.

Wars of Scottish Independence 

During the Wars of Scottish Independence, Sir William Douglas the Hardy, Lord of Douglas was governor of Berwick-upon-Tweed when the town and Berwick Castle were besieged by the English. Douglas was captured and was released only after he had agreed to accept the claim of the Edward I of England to be overlord of Scotland. He subsequently joined William Wallace in fighting for Scottish independence, but was captured and taken to England, where he died in 1298, a prisoner in the Tower of London.

The "Good" Sir James Douglas or "Black Douglas" 

William Le Hardi's son, James Douglas, "The Good Sir James" (c. 1286–1330), was the first to acquire the epithet "the Black". He shared in the early misfortunes of Robert the Bruce and in the defeats at Methven and Dalrigh in 1306. But for both men these setbacks provided a valuable lesson in tactics: limitations in both resources and equipment meant that the Scots would always be at a disadvantage in conventional medieval warfare.

By the time the fighting flared up again in the spring of 1307 they had learned the value of guerrilla warfare – known at the time as "secret war" – using fast-moving, lightly equipped and agile forces to maximum effect against an enemy often dependent on static defensive positions. Sir James Douglas recaptured Roxburgh Castle from the English in 1313. He was made a knight banneret, a high honor, and fought at the Battle of Bannockburn in 1314.

The English called Sir James "The Black Douglas" for what they considered his dark deeds: he became the bogeyman of a Northern English lullaby "Hush ye, hush ye, little pet ye. Hush ye, hush ye, do not fret ye. The Black Douglas shall not get ye." Unsubstantiated theories point to his colouring and complexion, this is tenuous. Douglas appears only in English records as "The Black" – Scots chronicles almost always referred to him as "The Guid" or "The Good". Later Douglas lords took the moniker of their revered forebear in the same way that they attached the image of Bruce's heart to their coat of arms: to strike fear into the hearts of their enemies and to exhibit the prowess of their race.

Crusader 

King Robert the Bruce had requested that Douglas, latterly his most esteemed companion in arms, should carry his heart to the Holy Land, as atonement for the murder of John III Comyn. Douglas and his knights had joined the forces of Alfonso XI of Castile, Edward III of England's cousin by his mother Queen Isabella, to fight against the Moors in 1330 at the siege of Teba. Outnumbered and cut off from the main Christian force, Douglas was killed leading a cavalry charge. The casket containing the heart of the Bruce was recovered and returned to Scotland, to be interred at Melrose Abbey. Douglas' bones were boiled and returned to Scotland. Tradition claimed that his embalmed heart was lodged in the Douglas vaults at the Kirk of St Bride. Meanwhile, his bones are not in the stone vault lying under his effigy and they have yet to be located. By 1333 King Robert's 'bloody heart' was incorporated in the arms of Sir James' son, William, Lord of Douglas. It subsequently appeared, sometimes with a royal crown, in every branch of the Douglas family.

Sir Archibald Douglas, Guardian of the Realm 

The Scottish army that fought and lost the Battle of Halidon Hill in 1333 was led by James' youngest brother who had been elected Regent of Scotland in late March 1333. Sir Archibald Douglas has been badly treated by some historians; frequently misidentifying this Douglas warrior as the Tyneman or loser when the moniker was intended for a later less fortunate but equally warlike Archibald. He was mentioned in Barbour's The Brus for his great victory during the Weardale campaign; leading the Scottish army further south into County Durham he devastated the lands and took much booty from Darlington and other nearby towns and villages.

Sir James 'The Good' Douglas' son William succeeded to the title as Lord of Douglas but may not have completed his title to the estates, possibly because he might have been underage. He died at Halidon Hill with his uncle, Sir Archibald Douglas. James' younger brother, Hugh the Dull, Lord of Douglas, a canon serving the See of Glasgow and held a prebendary at Roxburgh became Lord Douglas in 1342; Hugh of Douglas resigned his title to his nephew, the youngest surviving son of the Regent Archibald, William Lord of Douglas who was to become the first Earl. The First Earl's legitimate son James Douglas, 2nd Earl of Douglas succeeded him. His illegitimate son by Margaret Stewart, 4th Countess of Angus was George Douglas, 1st Earl of Angus, who was the progenitor of the Earls of Angus also known as the "Red Douglases".

The prestige of the family was greatly increased when James Douglas's great nephew, James Douglas, 2nd Earl of Douglas married Isabel, a daughter of King Robert II of Scotland. In 1388 at the Battle of Otterburn he was instrumental to the Scots' victory but was killed during the fighting. Leaving no legitimate heir, his titles passed to the illegitimate son of his great-uncle.

15th century

Wars with England 
Archibald Douglas, 3rd Earl of Douglas did much to consolidate the family's power and influence. He successfully defended Edinburgh Castle against Henry IV of England in 1400 but died the following year.

His son, Archibald Douglas, 4th Earl of Douglas, married the daughter of Robert III of Scotland. The fourth Earl fought against King Henry IV of England at the Battle of Shrewsbury in 1403, where he was taken prisoner.

In 1406, with the death of the king, the 4th Earl of Douglas became one of the council of regents to rule Scotland during the childhood of James I of Scotland. In 1412, the 4th Earl had visited Paris, when he entered into a personal alliance with John the Fearless, Duke of Burgundy, and in 1423, he commanded a contingent of 10,000 Scots sent to the aid of Charles VII of France against the English. He was made lieutenant-general in Joan of Arc's French army, and received the title Duke of Touraine, with remainder to his heirs-male, on 19 April 1424. The newly created French duke was defeated and slain at Battle of Verneuil on 17 August 1424, along with his second son, James, and son-in-law John Stewart, Earl of Buchan.

Black Dinner 

In 1440, the 16-year-old William Douglas, 6th Earl of Douglas, and his younger brother were invited to dine with the ten-year-old King James II of Scotland. Later called the Black Dinner, the occasion was organised by the Lord Chancellor, Sir William Crichton, and James Douglas, 7th Earl of Douglas who inherited the young earl's wealth and titles. While they ate, a black bull's head, a symbol of death, was brought in and placed before the Earl. Over the protests of the young King James II, the two brothers were then dragged out to Castle Hill, given a mock trial and beheaded. Clan Douglas then laid siege to Edinburgh Castle. Perceiving the danger, Crichton surrendered the castle to the king and was rewarded with the title Lord Crichton. It is still unclear exactly who else was ultimately responsible, though it is thought Livingston and Buchan were likely candidates. However, it was James Douglas and his son who profited.

Clan conflicts 

In 1448, Hugh Douglas, Earl of Ormond led a Scottish force to victory against an English army at the Battle of Sark.

Sir Alexander Gordon was created Earl of Huntly in 1449. At this time the king was at enmity with the Black Douglases. The Gordons stood on the king's side, and with their men involved in the south of the country, Archibald Douglas, Earl of Moray took the opportunity to sack the Gordon lands, setting Huntly Castle ablaze. However, the Gordons returned and quickly destroyed their enemies. Although the castle was burned to the ground, a grander castle was built in its place.

The Douglases had a long feud with Clan Colville. Sir Richard Colville had killed the Laird of Auchinleck who was an ally of the Douglases. To avenge this murder the Douglases attacked the Colvilles in their castle, where many were killed. The Douglases levelled the Colvilles' castle and put their men to the sword. William Douglas, 8th Earl of Douglas personally executed Richard Colville.

Murder of the Earl of Douglas by King James II 

After fruitless feuding with the Douglases, the King invited William Douglas, 8th Earl of Douglas to Stirling Castle in 1452 under the promise of safe conduct, but then the King accused the Earl of conspiracy in his dealings with the Yorkists in England and through a pact made between Douglas, the Earl of Crawford and the Lord of the Isles. Upon Douglas' refusal to repudiate the pact and reaffirm his loyalty to James II, the King drew his dagger and stabbed Douglas in the throat. The story goes that the King's Captain of the Guard then finished off the Earl with a pole axe. The body was thrown from the window into a garden below, where it was later given burial. A stained glass window bearing the Douglas Arms now overlooks "Douglas Garden", the spot where the Earl is said to have fallen.

Feud with the Royal Stewarts 

In 1455, James Douglas, 9th Earl of Douglas (the Black Douglas) rebelled against the king but his forces were defeated at the Battle of Arkinholm by the king's forces who were commanded by George Douglas, 4th Earl of Angus (the Red Douglas). This brought an end to the Black Douglases. After the battle an act of parliament gave the Earl of Angus the lordship of Douglas with the original possessions of his ancestors in Douglasdale. The 9th Earl of Douglas was later defeated by the forces of King James III of Scotland at the Battle of Lochmaben Fair in 1484.

16th-century conflicts 

In 1513, there was a strong Douglas contingent at the Battle of Flodden, where two of Archibald Douglas, 5th Earl of Angus's sons were killed along with 200 men of the name of Douglas.

In 1526, Archibald Douglas, 6th Earl of Angus defeated Walter Scott of Branxholme and Buccleuch, chief of Clan Scott, at the Battle of Melrose, who was attempting to rescue the young James V of Scotland from Douglas.

A dispute occurred in 1530, when Sir Robert Charteris, the 8th Laird and chief of Clan Charteris fought a duel with Sir James Douglas of Drumlanrig in what was said to have been one of the last great chivalric contests. It was fought with all the observance of a medieval tournament with heralds and the king himself watching from the castle walls. The joust was apparently fought with such fury that Charteris' sword was broken and the king had to send his men-at-arms to part the combatants.

Archibald Douglas, 6th Earl of Angus held the post of Lord Chancellor and became guardian of James V of Scotland by marrying his widowed mother, Margaret Tudor, sister of Henry VIII of England, with whom he had a daughter, Margaret Douglas, mother of Henry Stuart, Lord Darnley. In 1545, Angus led his forces to victory at the Battle of Ancrum Moor where they defeated the English army during the Rough Wooing, and he was also present at the defeat in 1547 at the Battle of Pinkie Cleugh.

James Douglas, 4th Earl of Morton, nephew of the 6th Earl of Angus, was a bitter enemy of Mary, Queen of Scots. He was one of the murderers of the queen's secretary David Rizzio and was heavily implicated in the murder of her second husband Lord Darnley. In 1572 he was elected regent for the still minor King James VI. In many respects Morton was an energetic and capable ruler, but he was brutal in crushing factions still loyal to Queen Mary. Regent Morton was finally forced to resign in March 1578, but retained much of his power. Ultimately, he was accused of complicity in the murder of Darnley and was executed in 1581.

17th century and the Bishops' War 

During the Wars of the Three Kingdoms, William Douglas, 11th Earl of Angus, a Catholic, was a supporter of King Charles I. In 1633, he was created Marquess of Douglas. Following the Battle of Kilsyth in 1645, he joined James Graham, 1st Marquess of Montrose, and was present when Royalist forces fought Covenanter cavalry at the Battle of Philiphaugh where he barely escaped with his life. Following Cromwell's victory, he was able to make peace and was fined £1,000.

In 1660, William Douglas, the brother of the second Marquess of Douglas became, through marriage, the Duke of Hamilton. Eventually, the titles of Marquess of Douglas, Earl of Angus, and several others devolved to the Dukes of Hamilton and the heir of that house is always styled Marquess of Douglas and Clydesdale. The Douglas and Hamilton lines became Douglas-Hamilton and, under Scots law, are barred from inheriting the title of chief of Clan Douglas due to the hyphenated surname. This similarly applies to the Douglas-Home family who joined their surnames in the nineteenth century.

In 1689, James Douglas, Earl of Angus raised the Cameronian regiment (Earl of Angus's regiment). Although greatly outnumbered, the regiment managed to defeat a larger Jacobite force at the Battle of Dunkeld. The regiment was victorious under the command of Captain George Munro, 1st of Auchinbowie.

18th century and the Jacobite risings 

In 1703, the Marquisate of Douglas was elevated to a Dukedom. Archibald Douglas, 1st Duke of Douglas married Margaret Douglas (a distant relation) late in life and had no direct heir – the title of Duke became extinct on his death. By the late 17th century, more political power was wielded by the Douglases of Drumlanrig, in Dumfriesshire who are also descended from the Black Douglases. The Douglases of Drumlanrig had become Earl of Queensberry in 1633, Marquises in 1682 and Dukes in 1684. The maneuvers of James Douglas, 2nd Duke of Queensberry, contributed to the Union of 1707.

During the Jacobite risings of the 18th century the Douglases continued their support for the British Government.  Archibald Douglas, 1st Duke of Douglas led the volunteer horse at Battle of Sheriffmuir during the Jacobite rising of 1715. Also at that fight was the Duke's young cousin, Archibald Douglas, 2nd Earl of Forfar, colonel of the 3rd Regiment of foot, and who died of wounds taken there shortly afterward. Douglas Castle was burnt by the Highland armies of Bonnie Prince Charlie in the Jacobite rising of 1745. Douglas Castle was again burnt down in 1755, and the Duke commenced work on a new edifice designed by Robert Adam. Building work ceased on the Duke's death in 1761, and with it his Dukedom became extinct. The Marquisate of Douglas and Earldom of Angus devolved to James Hamilton, 7th Duke of Hamilton, the senior male-line descendant of William Douglas, 1st Marquess of Douglas, his great-great-great grandfather, by the way of his son, Lord William Douglas, 1st Earl of Selkirk, whom upon his marriage to Anne Hamilton, 3rd Duchess of Hamilton, became William Hamilton, Duke of Hamilton, the adoption of the surname Hamilton being one of the conditions to inheriting the Dukedom. His descendants would later add Douglas back to the surname and become the Douglas-Hamilton branch.

20th century and the World Wars 

In 1895, Alfred Douglas-Hamilton inherited the Dukedom of Hamilton from his cousin William Douglas-Hamilton, 12th Duke of Hamilton and became Alfred Douglas-Hamilton, 13th Duke of Hamilton. Alfred Douglas-Hamilton was the great-great-great grandson of James Hamilton, 4th Duke of Hamilton through a collateral line. During World War I, Hamilton Palace, the main family seat, was used as a hospital with his blessing. During World War II, his sons, Douglas Douglas-Hamilton, 14th Duke of Hamilton, George Douglas-Hamilton, 10th Earl of Selkirk, Lord Malcolm Douglas-Hamilton, and Lord David Douglas-Hamilton made history by all being squadron leaders or above at the outbreak of the war. Lord David Douglas-Hamilton was killed in action in 1944. The 14th Duke of Hamilton was the first man to fly over Mt. Everest. His son, Angus Douglas-Hamilton, 15th Duke of Hamilton was also in the Royal Air Force and achieved the rank of flight lieutenant during his service in the Cold War. He was the father of the current Duke, Alexander Douglas-Hamilton, 16th Duke of Hamilton. The current heir apparent to the Dukedom is the 16th Duke's son, Douglas Charles Douglas-Hamilton, Marquess of Douglas and Clydesdale.

The Swedish branch

The lineage of the Swedish branch of the Douglas of Dalkeith line begins with James Douglas, documented in 1353, died in 1420. His descendant Sir William Douglas of Whittingehame (which had come from the Earls of March by marriage to James Douglas of Dalkeith in 1372) became English ambassador to the royal Danish court at Copenhagen in 1603. His grandson, the Scottish-born Robert Douglas (1611–1662), transplanted this branch of the Scottish clan to Sweden when in 1627 he became an officer in the Thirty Years' War; In 1657 he became field marshal. He received the Swedish title of Baron in 1651 and the title of Count (the highest title awarded to non-royalty in Sweden) in 1654. He was enfeoffed with the county of Skänninge and introduced in 1654 to the class of counts of the Swedish nobility under No. 19. From 1655 he built Stjärnorp Castle in Östergötland, which is still an ancestral seat of the Swedish branch today, besides Ekensholm Castle and Rydboholm Castle. The escutcheon of the Swedish Douglas family's arms is the Scottish Douglas arms. 

Robert Douglas' descendants, the Swedish counts Douglas (the title is not primogenous, but is held by all members of the line), are one of Sweden's most prominent noble families since the mid 17th century and has included numerous prominent individuals, such as Foreign Minister Ludvig Douglas. Count Gustaf Douglas is an important entrepreneur. His sisters are Rosita Spencer-Churchill, Duchess of Marlborough, and Princess Elisabeth, Duchess in Bavaria, the wife of Prince Max, Duke in Bavaria. Walburga Habsburg, Countess Douglas, the daughter of Austria-Hungary's last crown prince, is a member of this family by her marriage to Count Archibald Douglas.

Through a marriage in 1848 to Countess Louise von Langenstein und Gondelsheim, an illegitimate daughter of Louis I, Grand Duke of Baden, the Swedish Count Carl Israel Wilhelm Douglas (1824–1898) came into possession of Langenstein Castle in Baden, near Lake Constance. Their children achieved important political offices in both Sweden and Germany: their son count Wilhelm Douglas was a member of the German Reichstag, his brother count Ludvig Douglas (1849–1916) was the Swedish foreign minister, and their grandson count Archibald Douglas (1883–1960) was chief of staff of the Swedish army. In 1906, the grandson Karl Robert took up his main residence at Langenstein Castle, which his descendants still live in today.

Chief 
Alexander Douglas-Hamilton, 16th Duke of Hamilton, and 13th Duke of Brandon is heir to the chiefdom of the house of Douglas, but he cannot assume the title of chief since the Lord Lyon King of Arms requires him to assume the single name Douglas. Note that the Duke of Hamilton is the Chief of Clan Hamilton. For a list of the historic chiefs of Clan Douglas see: Earl of Douglas until 1455 and Earl of Angus for after 1455.

Douglas castles 

 Aberdour Castle, Fife, held by the Earls of Morton (partially preserved).
 Balvenie Castle, Moray, held by James Douglas, 7th Earl of Douglas (ruined).
 Berwick Castle, Northumberland. Governed by William "le Hardi".(ruined, now forms part of Berwick-upon-Tweed railway station)
 Bonkyll Castle (Bunkle), Berwickshire.
 Bothwell Castle, South Lanarkshire (ruins).
 Bowhill House, Selkirkshire. Home of the Duke of Buccleuch and Queensberry (preserved).
 Cranshaws Castle.
 Dalkeith Castle, Mid-Lothian. (heavily converted)
 Douglas Castle, in South Lanarkshire (now only minimal ruins remain).
 Drumlanrig Castle, Dumfries and Galloway. 17th-century mansion house of the Dukes of Buccleuch and Queensberry (preserved).
 Grangemuir House, Fife.
 Hawthornden Castle, Mid-Lothian.
 Hermitage Castle, Roxburghshire, 13th-century Douglas stronghold (restored ruin).
 Hume Castle, Berwickshire. ancient links with Douglas, home of Sir Alexander Douglas.
 Kilspindie Castle, East Lothian. Home to the Douglases of Kilspindie, (scant ruins)
 Langenstein Castle, Germany, to this day home to the Swedish-German branch (Counts Douglas).
 Lennoxlove House, East Lothian. Home of the Duke of Hamilton, (also the Marquess of Douglas and Clydesdale, Earl of Angus etc.) (preserved).
 Loch Leven Castle, Kinross. First home of the Earl of Morton (ruins).
 Lochindorb Castle, Strathspey
 Morton Castle, Nithsdale, Dumfries and Galloway. ruined former home of the Douglas Earls of Morton.
 Newark Castle, Selkirkshire.
 Neidpath Castle, Peeblesshire.
 Ormond Castle, Black Isle.
 Roxburgh Castle, captured by Sir James Douglas.
 Rydboholm Castle, home to the Swedish branch.
 Sandilands Castle, Fife (ruins).
 Stjärnorp Castle, Östergötland, Sweden (partially ruined), home to the Swedish branch.
 Strathaven Castle, South Lanarkshire
 Strathendry Castle, Fife.
 Tantallon Castle, East Lothian. Stronghold of the Red Douglases (partially ruined).
 Threave Castle, Dumfries and Galloway (ruins).
 Timpendean Tower, Roxburghshire (ruins).
 Whittingehame Tower, East Lothian.

Titles 

 Peerage of Scotland
 Duke of Hamilton, Marquess of Clydesdale, Earl of Arran and Cambridge, Lord Aven and Innerdale (1643)
 Duke of Hamilton, Marquess of Clydesdale, Earl of Arran, Lanark and Selkirk, Lord Aven, Machanshire, Polmont and Daer (Life Peerage, 1660)
 Duke of Queensberry, Marquess of Dumfriesshire (1684)
 Marquess of Douglas, Earl of Angus, Lord Abernerthy and Jedburgh Forest (1633)
 Marquess of Queensberry, Earl of Drumlanrig and Sanquhar, Viscount Nith, Torthorwald and Ross, Lord Douglas of Kilmount, Middlebie and Dornock (1682)
 Earl of Mar (c. 1114)
 Earl of Wigtown (1341)
 Earl of Douglas (1358)
 Earl of Angus (1389)
 Earl of Avondale (1437)
 Earl of Morton (1458)
 Earl of Queensberry, Viscount of Drumlanrig, Lord Douglas of Hawick and Tibbers (1633)
 Earl of Lanark, Lord Machanshire and Polmont (1639)
 Earl of Arran (1643)
 Earl of Selkirk, Lord Daer and Shortcleugh (1646)
 Earl of Orkney, Viscount of Kirkwall, Lord Dechmont (1696)
 Earl of March, Viscount of Peebles, Lord Douglas of Neidpath, Lyne and Munard (1697)
 Earl of Solway, Viscount Tibbers, Lord Douglas of Lockerby, Dalveen and Thornhill (1706)
 Viscount of Drumlanrig, Lord Douglas of Hawick and Tibbers (1628)
 Viscount of Belhaven (1633)

 Peerage of Great Britain
 Duke of Dover, Marquess of Beverley, Baron Ripon (1708)
 Duke of Brandon, Baron Dutton (1711)
 Baron Hamilton of Hameldon (1776)
 Baron Douglas of Lochleven (1791)

 Peerage of the United Kingdom
 Baron Solway (1833)
 Baron Penrhyn (1866)
 Baron Kelhead (1893)
 Baron Douglas of Kirtleside (1948)
 Baron Selkirk of Douglas (Life Peerage, 1997)

Tartans

Eminent members of the Douglas family 
Douglases have excelled in many fields, from politics to sports, science to the military, and more. Biographies held on Wikipedia can be found in the lists: 'Douglas (surname) and Douglass (surname)'.

Family tree

Popular culture 
Samuel Rutherford Crockett's 1899 novel The Black Douglas featured the "Black Dinner".

In the Highlander novel Scotland the Brave, James Douglas is a fictional Scot born into Clan Douglas, who died his First Death in 1746 at the Battle of Culloden.

The Black Dinner served as inspiration for the events of the Red Wedding depicted in A Storm of Swords, the third book of George R. R. Martin's A Song of Ice and Fire series. Material based on the Red Wedding was included in the episode "The Rains of Castamere" of the HBO drama Game of Thrones which aired on 2 June 2013 in the United States.

See also 
 Armigerous clan
 Earl of Home
 Scottish clan

Notes

References

Sources

External links 
 Clan Douglas Society of North America
 Douglas History The Douglas Archives – a compendium of historical notes and biographies.

Douglas
 
Douglas
Scottish Lowlands

lt:Škotijos klanai